Some Girls Do is a 1969 British comedy spy film directed by Ralph Thomas. It was the second of the revamped Bulldog Drummond films (following 1967's Deadlier Than the Male) starring Richard Johnson as Drummond, made following the success of the James Bond films of the 1960s. Some Girls Do even featured a white Aston Martin DB5, the same marque used by Bond.

Plot

A series of inexplicable accidents befall the development of the world's first supersonic airliner, the SST1 – a man falls victim to a homicidal air stewardess (an uncredited Maria Aitken) and two women (Yutte Stensgaard and an uncredited Joanna Lumley) perform separate acts of sabotage during tests. The Air Ministry calls on Hugh "Bulldog" Drummond (Richard Johnson) to investigate.

Aided by ditzy American blonde Flicky (Sydne Rome), Drummond uncovers a plot by criminal mastermind Carl Petersen (James Villiers), who stands to gain eight million pounds if the aircraft is not ready by a certain date. Petersen, assisted by beautiful but deadly assassins Helga (Daliah Lavi) and Pandora (Beba Lončar), has developed a number of robots: beautiful girls with electronic brains to help him sabotage the SST1 project by means of infrasound (sound waves with too low frequency to be detected by the human ear) which can be directed at people or objects with devastating results.

After the initial sabotage attacks by Peterson's robots, Helga and Pandora begin systematically murdering various people associated with the SSTI, such as engineer Dudley Mortimer (Maurice Denham) and Miss Mary (Robert Morley), a spy who runs a cooking class as a front for his activities. Helga makes contact with Drummond at a shooting party, and attempts to kill him by planting a bomb in his telephone after sleeping with him. Then Helga and Pandora try to kill Drummond again by crashing into his glider. The ripcord from his parachute was sabotaged but Drummond manages to manually open his parachute and escape death.

The trail leads Drummond to North Africa, following up on a lead on an infrasound-powered powerboat, where he is assisted by Peregrine Carruthers (Ronnie Stevens) from the British Embassy. Pandora kills the boat owner with a miniature infrasound device, but is thwarted in her attempt to steal the boat. Drummond and Peregrine decide to drive the powerboat in a scheduled race: Helga and Pandora also participate in the race and successfully capture the men and the boat, delivering them all to Petersen at his island headquarters, staffed by an army of his female robots, including the defective but endearing No. 7 (Vanessa Howard). Drummond and Peregrine are also reunited with Flicky, who has successfully infiltrated Petersen's organisation.

Over dinner, Petersen reveals the full details of his plan to use infrasound technology to sabotage the SST1's maiden flight. That night, Drummond sleeps with Helga once more, while Pandora contents herself with seducing Peregrine. In the morning, Drummond attempts to retrieve the infrasound powerboat and is met by Flicky, who tells him she is actually a CIA agent assigned to help him. They are caught by Helga – Drummond escapes but Helga holds Flicky at gunpoint. Petersen sends his robots to search the island for the runaway agent – Drummond is cornered by No. 7, but to his surprise, she deliberately chooses not to reveal his location.

Peregrine and Flicky are held hostage in Petersen's control room and are forced to witness the SST1's destruction as he puts his plan into action. Drummond scales the wall of Petersen's hideout, and saves the SST1 from destruction by using Petersen's infrasound waves against him, destroying his control room. Petersen, Pandora and Helga are all apparently killed in the explosion.

Drummond, Flicky, Peregrine and No. 7 escape the subsequent mayhem, having retrieved the infrasound device. Flicky reveals herself to be a double agent working for the Russians and escapes on the powerboat with the device. Peregrine, wanting to improve his Russian relations, decides to go with her. As the base finally explodes, Drummond finds comfort in the arms of the beautiful No. 7, who turns out not to be a robot after all.

Cast

 Richard Johnson as Hugh "Bulldog" Drummond
 Daliah Lavi as Baroness Helga Hagen
 Beba Lončar as Pandora
 James Villiers as Carl Petersen
 Vanessa Howard as Robot No. 7
 Maurice Denham as Dudley Mortimer
 Robert Morley as Miss Mary
 Sydne Rome as Flicky
 Ronnie Stevens as Peregrine Carruthers
 Virginia North as Robot No. 9
 Adrienne Posta as Drummond's Daily
 Florence Desmond as Lady Manderley
 Nicholas Phipps as Lord Dunburry
 Yutte Stensgaard as Robot No. 1
 George Belbin as Major Newman
 Richard Hurndall as President of Aircraft Company
 Marga Roche as Birgit
 Douglas Sheldon as Kruger
 Joanna Lumley as Robot No. 2 (uncredited)
 Maria Aitken as Flight attendant (uncredited)
 Shakira Caine as Robot Observer (uncredited)
 Johnny Briggs as Air traffic controller (uncredited)
 Dora Graham as Robot Twin (uncredited)
 Doris Graham as Robot Twin (uncredited)

Production
Filming began May 1968 and took place mainly in Spain. One of the British filming locations was the National Gas Turbine Establishment at Farnborough. It was known as "Pyestock". The locale doubled for the British Atomic plant where the engines and wind tunnel models of the fictional SST1 were being tested. Wycombe Air Park was also used as a location in the film for the glider sequence.

Joanna Lumley, who appears uncredited as one of Petersen's female robots in the film, was also working on the set of On Her Majesty's Secret Service at the same time, as both films were produced at Pinewood Studios. Virginia North also worked on both films simultaneously.

Reception
The contemporary review in The New York Times was especially scathing, calling Some Girls Do an "... addlepated distant cousin of James Bond... Richard Johnson, (stars as) the glum Drummond of this mishmash of an intrigue ... Reviewer Leslie Halliwell dismissed the film as an "... abysmal spoof melodrama in the swinging 60s mould; a travesty of a famous character."

See also
 James Bond parodies

References

Notes

Citations

Bibliography

External links

Some Girls Do at BFI
Some Girls Do at Britmovie
"Review of film". at The New York Times

Films based on Bulldog Drummond
1969 films
British action comedy films
British science fiction comedy films
British spy comedy films
1960s English-language films
British sequel films
Films directed by Ralph Thomas
Films produced by Betty Box
Supersonic transports
British aviation films
Films shot at Pinewood Studios
United Artists films
1960s action comedy films
1960s science fiction comedy films
1960s spy comedy films
1969 comedy films
1960s British films